Post-Marxism is a trend in political philosophy and social theory which deconstructs Karl Marx's writings and Marxism itself, bypassing orthodox Marxism. The term "post-Marxism" first appeared in Ernesto Laclau and Chantal Mouffe's theoretical work Hegemony and Socialist Strategy. It can be said that post-Marxism as a political theory was conceived at the University of Essex by Laclau and Mouffe, and was further developed by Louis Althusser and Slavoj Žižek. Philosophically, post-Marxism counters derivationism and essentialism (for example, it does not see economy as a foundation of politics and the state as an instrument that functions unambiguously and autonomously on behalf of the interests of a given class). Recent overviews of post-Marxism are provided by Ernesto Screpanti, Göran Therborn, and Gregory Meyerson.

History 
Post-Marxism dates from the late 1960s and several trends and events of that period influenced its development. The weakness of the Soviet Union and Eastern Bloc paradigm became evident and Marxism faced a crisis of credibility from the time of the Second International onwards. This happened concurrently with the occurrence internationally of the strikes and occupations of 1968, the rise of Maoist theory and its synthesis with Marxism–Leninism, and the proliferation of commercial television which covered in its broadcasts the Vietnam War. Subsequently, Laclau and Mouffe address the proliferation of "new subject positions" by locating their analysis on a post-Marxist non-essentialist framework.

See also 

 Arena
 Autonomism
 Budapest School (Lukács)
 Frankfurt School
 Marxist philosophy
 Neo-Marxism
 Neo-Marxian economics
 New Left Review 
 Open Marxism
 Poststructuralism
 Rethinking Marxism
 Specters of Marx

References

Further reading

External links 
 Kurz, Robert (1995). Postmarxismus und Arbeitsfetisch. Krisis. No. 17 ,
 Marchart, Oliver (1998). Beantwortung der Frage: Was heißt Post-Marxismus?. Eintrag für Vladimir Malachov, Vadim Filatov: Sovremennaja zapadnaja filosofia, Moscow .

Critical theory
Eponymous political ideologies
Marxist schools of thought
Social theories